Major-General Sir Alfred William Fortescue Knox (30 October 1870 – 9 March 1964) was a career British military officer and later a Conservative Party politician.

Military career
Born in Ulster, Knox joined the British Army when he attended the Royal Military College, Sandhurst, from where he was commissioned a second lieutenant in the Royal Irish Rifles on 2 May 1891, and was promoted to lieutenant on 18 November 1893. He was posted to British India where he joined the 5th Punjab Infantry, became a double company commander, and was promoted to captain on 10 July 1901. He was adjutant to the Southern Waziristan Militia, and as such took part in operations in Waziristan under Major-General Charles Egerton in summer 1902, for which he was mentioned in despatches.

In 1911 Knox was appointed the British Military Attaché in then Russian Empire. A fluent speaker of Russian, he became a liaison officer to the Imperial Russian Army during First World War. During the 1917 Bolshevik coup in Russia he observed the Bolsheviks' taking of the Winter Palace on 7 November (25 October Old Style) 1917.

He wrote:

During the Russian Civil War, he was the head of the British Mission (Britmis) and notional Chef d'Arrière of the White Army in Siberia under Admiral Kolchak. He barely intervened in the combat operations, as Kolchak was unwilling to listen to his advice and to accept demands about a Russian Constituent Assembly after the war.

In 1921 Knox published his memoirs, With the Russian Army: 1914–1917. In this book he also tells the story of heroine Elsa Brändström.

Political career
At the 1924 general election, he was elected as a Conservative Member of Parliament (MP) for Wycombe, defeating the sitting Liberal MP Lady Terrington. He held his seat during the 1929 general election and through subsequent general elections, serving in the House of Commons until the 1945 general election. In 1934, Knox argued against Indian self-government by stating "India, diverse in races and creed and united only by Britain, is not ready for democracy." His parliamentary questions mainly concerned the Stalinist Soviet Union and the threat of Hitler as well as the rearmament of Britain during the interwar period. Knox remained a strong opponent of Communism throughout his career and following the 1939 Soviet invasion of Finland during World War II, he campaigned to give military support to the Finns.

He died on 9 March 1964.

In Fiction
Knox is depicted in the book August 1914 by Aleksandr Solzhenitsyn, as a somewhat troublesome attache as General Samsonov attempts to lead his army through East Prussia.

References

External links
 
Alfred Knox

 
 

1870 births
1964 deaths
Military personnel from Northern Ireland
British Indian Army generals
Conservative Party (UK) MPs for English constituencies
UK MPs 1924–1929
UK MPs 1929–1931
UK MPs 1931–1935
UK MPs 1935–1945
Indian Army generals of World War I
Graduates of the Royal Military College, Sandhurst
British anti-communists
British military personnel of the Russian Civil War
Royal Ulster Rifles officers
British military attachés
People from Ulster